Hios or Chios,  is a Greek island situated in the Aegean Sea.

Hios may also refer to:
 HiOS is mobile operating system developed by Tecno Mobile, which is based on Android Lollipop
 HIoS is a safety management platform at construction sites developed by Hyundai Engineering & Construction.